ST-1 is a communications satellite owned by Singapore Telecom and Taiwan's Chunghwa Telecom Company, Ltd. It was placed launched on 25 August 1998, by an Ariane 4 rocket. The two companies jointly operate the spacecraft from control centres located in Seletar, Singapore and Taipei, Taiwan, respectively.

ST-1 carries 16 high-power  transponders and 14 medium-power C-band transponders. Weighing over 3,000 kg (6,600 lb.) at launch, ST-1 generates more than 6,500 Watts of electrical power. The satellite's broad C-band coverage beam extends from the Middle East to Japan, including all of Southeast Asia.

ST-1 also features two Ku-band spot beams: a "K1" beam that stretches from Taiwan to Singapore and from Indonesia to Malaysia and a "K2" beam centred over the Indian subcontinent. The ST-1 satellite currently delivers telephony, digital DTH broadcasting, VSAT and other business services throughout the region.

Singapore Telecom and Taiwan's Chunghwa Telecom Company are currently operating the replacement satellite ST-2 after ST-1 has reached its mission duration in 2011.

References

Communications satellites in geostationary orbit
Spacecraft launched in 1998
First artificial satellites of a country
Singapore–Taiwan relations
Satellites using the Eurostar bus